The Japan national junior handball team is the national under-20 handball team of Japan. Controlled by the Japan Handball Association That is an affiliate of the International Handball Federation IHF as well as a member of the Asian Handball Federation AHF ,The Team represents Japan in international matches.

Statistics

IHF Junior World Championship record
 Champions   Runners up   Third place   Fourth place

Squad
Last world championship
 1 HIRAO Katsuki
 2 TAKANO Sota
 3 SUEOKA Takumi
 6 HATTORI Masanari
 7 TOKUDA Rennesuke
 11 FUJITA Ryuga
 13 YANO Seito
 15 SAKURAI Tomoya
 16 NAKAMURA Hikaru
 21 NAKAMURA Tsubasa
 22 TAKAHASHI Kai
 25 KAWASAKI Shun
 27 OSUGI Takumi
 29 ISODA Kenta
 31 AO Masatoshi
 32 TSUYUKI Ryo

References

External links
World Men's Youth Championship table
European Men's Youth Championship table

Handball in Japan
Men's national junior handball teams
Handball
Handball